"Sea Me Now" is the second episode of the seventh season of the animated comedy series Bob's Burgers and the overall 109th episode, and is written by Dan Fybel and directed by Chris Song. It aired on Fox in the United States on October 2, 2016. In the episode, Teddy tries to impress his ex-wife, Denise, when the Belchers accompany him for a ride on his newly restored boat. Meanwhile, Tina takes care of Bob's restaurant eraser, in an attempt to get her own cell phone.

Plot
Teddy tries to impress his ex-wife by organizing a day trip on his newly refurbished boat; Tina attempts to prove she's responsible enough to have a cellphone by taking care of Bob's prized eraser.

Reception
Alasdair Wilkins of The A.V. Club gave the episode an A−, saying, "I’m not sure that the show has really previously established Tina as someone who loses things constantly, but it feels so completely true to her character that I’m perfectly prepared to believe that’s featured in every episode up to this point. As with Teddy, this is a story that unfolds more or less entirely in Tina’s own head, with the rest of the family only taking a moment to mourn the inevitable demise of a much-loved eraser. There’s a lovely payoff though, as Tina tells her dad that a cellphone would just distract her from all that’s around her. Of course, as soon as that legitimately lovely moment passes, the family immediately turns on Bob, summarily stripping him of all screen privileges. It’s that lovely mix of the sweet and the silly, the ridiculous and the mundane, that makes “Sea Me Now” such a terrific episode."

The episode received a 1.2 rating and was watched by a total of 2.79 million people.

References

External links 
 

2016 American television episodes
Bob's Burgers (season 7) episodes